The Tasmanian Department of Natural Resources and Environment (NRE) is the government department of the Tasmanian Government responsible for supporting primary industry development, the protection of Tasmania's natural environment, effective land and water management and the protection of Tasmania's relative disease and pest free status. NRE's responsibilities also include maintaining the security of land tenure, administration of much of the state's Crown lands and delivery of government services through Service Tasmania.

The department is led by its departmental secretary, Jason Jacobi, who reports to both the Minister for Primary Industries and Water, currently Jo Palmer, and the Minister for Parks, currently Jacquie Petrusma.

History and structure
The department was known as the Department of Primary Industries, Water and Environment from 1998 until April 2002, when its planning responsibilities were transferred to the Department of Justice and its environment responsibilities handed to a newly constituted Department of Tourism, Arts and the Environment.

Between April 2002 and 30 June 2009 it was known as the Department of Primary Industries and Water.  On 1 July 2009 it was amalgamated with the Environment, Parks and Heritage divisions of the Department of Environment, Parks, Heritage and the Arts to form the Department of Primary Industries, Parks, Water and Environment.  This returned the DPIPWE to a similar size and structure as to what it was between 1998 and 2002. In 1996 the department entered into a joint venture agreement with the University of Tasmania to form the Tasmanian Institute of Agricultural Research (TIAR). Between 2005 and 2009 all DPIPWE's agricultural research, development and extension staff and facilities were transferred to TIAR.

The department was known as the Department of Primary Industries, Parks, Water and Environment (DPIPWE) from 1 July 2009 until 1 December 2021, when it was renamed to the Department of Natural Resources and Environment Tasmania (NRE Tas).

See also

 List of Tasmanian government agencies

References

External links
 Official site

Primary
Water management in Tasmania
Tasmania
Environmental agencies in Australia
Tasmania